Jabalpur Division is an administrative geographical unit of Madhya Pradesh state of India. Jabalpur is the administrative headquarters of the division. As of 2005, the division consists of districts of Balaghat, Chhindwara, Jabalpur, Katni, Mandla, Narsinghpur,  Dindori and Seoni.

History
Jabalpur Division was originally constituted as the Jubbulpore Division of the Central Provinces of British India in 1861. The British division included the districts of Jabalpur, Sagar, Damoh, Seoni, and Mandla. The Central Provinces became the Central Provinces and Berar in 1936 until India's independence from the United Kingdom in 1947.

Balaghat District was formerly part of the Central Provinces' Nagpur division, but became part of Jabalpur Division when the rest of Nagpur Division was transferred to Bombay State in 1956.

See also
Central Provinces, Administration
Administrative divisions of British India

References

Divisions of Madhya Pradesh